Enrekang is an Austronesian language spoken on Sulawesi, Indonesia. It belongs to the Northern branch of the South Sulawesi subgroup, and is closely related to Duri and Maiwa.

References

Languages of Sulawesi
South Sulawesi languages